Qeshlaq-e Karimabad (also Romanized as Qeshlāq-e Karīmābād) is a village in Karimabad Rural District, Sharifabad District, Pakdasht County, Tehran Province, Iran. At the 2006 census, its population was 796, in 186 families.

References 

Populated places in Pakdasht County